In economics, a shortage or excess demand is a situation in which the demand for a product or service exceeds its supply in a market. It is the opposite of an excess supply (surplus).

Definitions 
In a perfect market (one that matches a simple microeconomic model), an excess of demand will prompt sellers to increase prices until demand at that price matches the available supply, establishing market equilibrium. In economic terminology, a shortage occurs when for some reason (such as government intervention, or decisions by sellers not to raise prices) the price does not rise to reach equilibrium.  In this circumstance, buyers want to purchase more at the market price than the quantity of the good or service that is available, and some non-price mechanism (such as "first come, first served" or a lottery) determines which buyers are served. So in a perfect market the only thing that can cause a shortage is price.

In common use, the term "shortage" may refer to a situation where most people are unable to find a desired good at an affordable price, especially where supply problems have increased the price.  "Market clearing" happens when all buyers and sellers willing to transact at the prevailing price are able to find partners.  There are almost always willing buyers at a lower-than-market-clearing price; the narrower technical definition doesn't consider failure to serve this demand as a "shortage", even if it would be described that way in a social or political context (which the simple model of supply and demand does not attempt to encompass).

Causes 
Shortages (in the technical sense) may be caused by the following causes:
 Price ceilings, a type of price control which involves a government-imposed limit on the price of a product or service.
 Anti-price gouging laws.
 Government ban on the sale of a product or service, such as prostitution or certain recreational drugs.
 Decisions by suppliers not to raise prices, for example to maintain friendly relationships with potential future customers during a supply disruption.
 Artificial scarcity.
 Worker shortages in low-wage industries (hospitality and leisure, education, health care, rail transportation, aviation, retail, manufacturing, food, elderly care) caused by excessively low salaries (relative to the domestic cost of living) and adverse working conditions (excessive workload and working hours), which collectively lead to occupational burnout and attrition of existing workers, insufficent incentives to attract the inflow supply of workers (through a voluntary exchange), short-staffing at workplaces and further exacerbation (positive feedback) of staff shortages.

Effects 
Decisions which result in a below-market-clearing price help some people and hurt others. In this case, shortages may be accepted because they theoretically enable a certain portion of the population to purchase a product that they couldn't afford at the market-clearing price. The cost is to those who are willing to pay for a product and either can't, or experience greater difficulty in doing so.

In the case of government intervention in the market, there is always a trade-off with positive and negative effects. For example, a price ceiling may cause a shortage, but it will also enable a certain percentage of the population to purchase a product that they couldn't afford at market costs. Economic shortages caused by higher transaction costs and opportunity costs (e.g., in the form of lost time) also mean that the distribution process is wasteful. Both of these factors contribute to a decrease in aggregate wealth.

Shortages may or will cause:

 Black (illegal) and Grey (unregulated) markets in which products that are unavailable in conventional markets are sold, or in which products with excess demand are sold at higher prices than in the conventional market.
 Artificial controls of demand, such as time (such as waiting in line at queues) and rationing.
 Non-monetary bargaining methods, such as time (for example queuing), nepotism, or even violence. 
 Panic buying
 Price discrimination.
 The inability to purchase a product, and subsequent forced saving.
 Increase in demand for substitute goods.
 Deadweight loss due to artificial scarcity; a net loss of economic welfare to society occurs when an artificial limit of supply (by monopolies or oligopolies to maximise profits), limits the number of people who can enjoy the good.

Examples 

Many regions around the world have experienced shortages in the past.
 Food shortages have occurred in the United States during the Great Depression.
 Rationing in the United Kingdom and the United States occurred mainly during and after the world wars
 Potato shortages in the Netherlands triggered the 1917 Potato riots.
 From 1920 to 1933 during prohibition in the United States, the creation of a black market for liquor was created due to the low supply of alcoholic beverages.
 During the 1973 oil crisis, during which long lines and rationing was used to control demand.
 In the former Soviet Union during the 1980s, prices were artificially low by fiat (i.e., high prices were outlawed). Soviet citizens waited in line for various price-controlled goods and services such as cars, apartments, or some types of clothing. From the point of view of those waiting in line, such goods were in perpetual "short supply"; some of them were willing and able to pay more than the official price ceiling, but were legally prohibited from doing so. This method for determining the allocation of goods in short supply is known as "rationing".
 From the mid-2000s through the 2010s, shortages in Venezuela occurred, due to the Venezuelan government's economic policies; such as relying on foreign imports while creating strict foreign exchange controls, put price controls in place and having expropriations result with lower domestic production. As a result of such shortages, Venezuelans had to search for products, wait in lines for hours and rationing was initiated, with the government allowing the purchase of a certain amount of products when it's available, through fingerprint recognition.
 Shortages in Sudan sparked a revolution in 2019 which ended President Omar al-Bashir's 30-year rule. They continued into 2020.
 Panic buying due to the COVID-19 pandemic caused food and product shortages around the world.

Shortages and "longages" 
Garrett Hardin emphasised that a shortage of supply can just as well be viewed as a "longage" of demand. For instance, a shortage of food can just as well be called a longage of people (overpopulation). By looking at it from this view, he felt the problem could be better dealt with.

Labour shortage

In its narrowest definition, a labour shortage is an economic condition in which employers believe there are insufficient qualified candidates (employees) to fill the marketplace demands for employment at a wage that is mostly employer-determined. Such a condition is sometimes referred to by economists as "an insufficiency in the labour force." An ageing population and a contracting workforce and a birth dearth may curb U.S. economic expansion for several decades, for example.

In a wider definition, a widespread domestic labour shortage is caused by excessively low salaries (relative to the domestic cost of living) and adverse working conditions (excessive workload and working hours) in low-wage industries (hospitality and leisure, education, health care, rail transportation, aviation, retail, manufacturing, food, elderly care), which collectively lead to occupational burnout and attrition of existing workers, insufficent incentives to attract the inflow supply of domestic workers (through a voluntary exchange), short-staffing at workplaces and further exacerbation (positive feedback) of staff shortages.

Labour shortages occur broadly across multiple industries within a rapidly expanding economy, whilst labour shortages often occur within specific industries (which generally offer low salaries) even during economic periods of high unemployment. In response to domestic labour shortages, business associations such as chambers of commerce would generally lobby to governments for an increase of the inward immigration of foreign workers from countries which are less developed and have lower salaries. In addition, business associations have campaigned for greater state provision of child care, which would enable more women to re-enter the labour workforce. However, as labour shortages in the relevant low-wage industries are often widespread globally throughout many countries in the world, immigration would only partially address the chronic labour shortages in the relevant low-wage industries in developed countries (whilst simultaneously discouraging local labour from entering the relevant industries) and in turn cause greater labour shortages in developing countries.

Wage factors
The Atlantic slave trade (which originated in the early 17th century but ended by the early 19th century) was said to have originated from perceived shortages of agricultural labour in the Americas (particularly in the Southern United States). It was thought that bringing African labor was the only means of malaria resistance available at the time. Ironically, malaria seems to itself have been introduced to the "New World" via the slave trade.

See also

References

 Kornai, János, Socialist economy, Princeton University Press, 1992, 
 Kornai, János, Economics of Shortage, Amsterdam: North Holland Press, Volume A, p. 27; Volume B, p. 196 .
 Gomulka, Stanislaw: Kornai's Soft Budget Constraint and the Shortage Phenomenon: A Criticism and Restatement, in: Economics of Planning, Vol. 19. 1985. No. 1.
 Planning Shortage and Transformation. Essays in Honor of Janos Kornai,  Cambridge, Massachusetts: MIT Press, 2000

External links 

 János Kornai Home Page at Harvard University
 János Kornai Home Page at Collegium Budapest
 Part 1 and Part 2 of COMPARING AND ASSESSING ECONOMIC SYSTEMS, Shortage and Inflation: The Phenomenon, PPT (PowerPoint file presentation) at West Virginia University
 János Kornai 'The Soft Budget Constraint'
 David Lipton and Jeffrey Sachs 'The Consequences of Central Planning in Eastern Europe'
 On overview and critique of Kornai's account can be found in 
 Planning For The Looming Labor Shortage - A Supply Chain Perspective by HK Systems
 "America's New Immigrant Entrepreneurs"  - A Duke University Study
 Criticism of high-tech shortage claims 
 Disputation of High-tech Labor Shortage by Dr. Matloff
 RAND Study on Alleged Shortage of Scientists
Shortage of skilled workers knocks red tape off top of business constraints league table - Grant Thornton IBR
The Real Science Gap - "It's not insufficient schooling or a shortage of scientists. It’s a lack of job opportunities."

Market (economics)
Price controls
Scarcity
Workforce